TRILL (Transparent Interconnection of Lots of Links) is an Internet Standard implemented by devices called TRILL switches. TRILL combines techniques from bridging and routing, and is the application of link-state routing to the VLAN-aware customer-bridging problem. Routing bridges (RBridges) are compatible with and can incrementally replace previous IEEE 802.1 customer bridges. TRILL Switches are also compatible with IPv4 and IPv6, routers and end systems. They are invisible to current IP routers, and like conventional routers, RBridges terminate the broadcast, unknown-unicast and multicast traffic of DIX Ethernet and the frames of IEEE 802.2 LLC including the bridge protocol data units of the Spanning Tree Protocol.

TRILL is the successor to Spanning Tree Protocol, both having been created by the same person, Radia Perlman. The catalyst for TRILL was an event at Beth Israel Deaconess Medical Center which began on 13 November 2002.  The concept of Rbridges [sic] was first proposed to the Institute of Electrical and Electronics Engineers in 2004, who in 2005 rejected what came to be known as TRILL, and in 2006 through 2012 devised an incompatible variation known as Shortest Path Bridging.

General overview
TRILL switches run a link-state routing protocol amongst themselves. A link-state protocol is one in which connectivity is broadcast to all the RBridges, so that each RBridge knows about all the other RBridges, and the connectivity between them. This gives RBridges enough information to compute pair-wise optimal paths for unicast, and calculate distribution trees for delivery of frames either to destinations whose location is unknown or to multicast or broadcast groups. The link-state routing protocol used is IS-IS because:
 it runs directly over layer 2, so it can be run without configuration [no IP addresses need be assigned], as it is inclusive of a subset of the Connectionless-mode Network Service (CLNP).
 it is easy to extend by defining new type–length–value (TLV) data elements and sub-elements for carrying TRILL information.

To mitigate temporary loop issues, RBridges forward based on a header with a hop count. RBridges also specify the next-hop RBridge as the frame destination when forwarding unicast frames across a shared-media link, which avoids spawning additional copies of frames during a temporary loop. A reverse-path forwarding check and other checks are performed on multi-destination frames to further control potentially looping traffic.

The first RBridge that a unicast frame encounters in a campus, RB1, encapsulates the received frame with a TRILL header that specifies the last RBridge, RB2, where the frame is decapsulated. RB1 is known as the "ingress RBridge" and RB2 is known as the "egress RBridge". To save room in the TRILL header and simplify forwarding lookups, a dynamic nickname acquisition protocol is run among the RBridges to select two-octet nicknames for RBridges, unique within the campus, which are an abbreviation for the six-octet IS-IS system ID of the RBridge. The two-octet nicknames are used to specify the ingress and egress RBridges in the TRILL header.

The TRILL header consists of six octets: the first two octets include a six-bit decrementing hop count, plus flags; the next two octets contain the egress RBridge nickname; the final two octets contain the ingress RBridge nickname. For multi-destination frames, the "egress RBridge nickname" specifies a distribution tree for the frame, where the (nick)named RBridge is the root of the distribution tree. The ingress RBridge selects which distribution tree the frame should travel along.

Even though RBridges are transparent to Layer 3 devices, and all the links interconnected by RBridges appear to Layer 3 devices to be a single link, RBridges act as link routers in the sense that, in the forwarding of a frame by a transit RBridge, the outer Layer 2 header is replaced at each hop with an appropriate Layer 2 header for the next hop, and the hop count is decreased. Despite these modifications of the outer Layer 2 header and the hop count in the TRILL Header, the original encapsulated frame is preserved, including the original frame's VLAN tag.

Multipathing of multi-destination frames through alternative distribution tree roots and equal-cost multi-path routing (ECMP) of unicast frames are supported. Networks with a more mesh-like structure benefit to a greater extent from the multipathing and optimal paths provided by TRILL than networks with a more tree-like structure.

A host with multiple interfaces running the Internet Protocol requires that each of the interfaces [or the group of interfaces in a team] have a unique address, whereas when using TRILL the multiple-interface host can have a single IP address for all of its interfaces attached to a common broadcast domain — akin to the case of a network service access point address (NSAP) on an end system in CLNP.

TRILL links
From the point of view of TRILL, a link can be any of a wide variety of link technologies, including IEEE 802.3 (Ethernet), PPP (Point to Point Protocol)., or a Pseudo-wire. Ethernet links between RBridges can incorporate IEEE customer or provider 802.1 bridges. In other words, an arbitrary bridged LAN appears to an RBridge as a multi-access link.

It is essential that only one RBridge act as the ingress RBridge for any given native frame and TRILL has an Appointed Forwarder  mechanism to assure this. TRILL does allow load splitting of this duty on a link based on VLAN, so that only one RBridge on each link encapsulates and decapsulates native frames for each VLAN.

RBridge ports
RBridge ports can compatibly implement a wide variety of existing and proposed link level and IEEE 802.1 port level protocols including PAUSE (IEEE 802.3 Annex 31B), the Link Layer Discovery Protocol (IEEE 802.1AB), link aggregation (IEEE 802.1AX), MAC security (IEEE 802.1AE), or port based access control (IEEE 802.1X). This is because RBridges are layered above the IEEE 802.1 EISS (Extended Internal Sublayer Service) with the exception that an RBridge port handles spanning tree and VLAN registration PDUs differently.

Open source implementations
Accton IgniteNet MeshLinq — based on Quagga 0.99.22.4

Gandi's quagga with TRILL — based on Quagga 0.99.22.4

MichaelQQ's Quagga-PE featuring TRILL and MPLS — based on Quagga 0.99.22.4

Proprietary implementations
Cisco FabricPath is a proprietary implementation of TRILL that utilizes the TRILL control plane (including IS-IS for Layer 2), but a non-interoperable data plane.
Brocade Virtual Cluster Switching, uses the TRILL data plane but a proprietary control plane and so is not interoperable with standards conformant TRILL.

VLAN support
The TRILL protocol provides mandatory support for the usual 4K VLANs and can optionally support 24-bit Fine Grain Labels (FGL) in addition to VLANs. (RFC 7172 "TRILL: Fine Grained Labeling")

Competitors 

The IEEE 802.1aq standard (Shortest Path Bridging – SPB) is considered the major competitor of TRILL. As one 2011 book noted, "the evaluation of relative merits and difference of the two standards proposals is currently a hotly debated topic in the networking industry."

Product support
 Shanghai Baud Data Communication S5800 and S9500
 Extreme Networks BD-X series, Summit X670 series and Summit X770 series
 HPE FlexFabric 5700, 9540 and 12900E
 Huawei CloudEngine 5800, 6860, 8800 and 12800
 IgniteNet MeshLinq ML-S-4GE-1MGE
 New H3C Technologies S6800, S6860, S10500 and S10500X
 Ruijie Networks RG-S6220, RG-S12000 and RG-N18000
 Shenzhen Youhua Technology YH-S5800 and YH-S9500
 ZTE Corporation ZXR10 5960 and ZXR10 9900(-S)

References

External links
 TRILL Working Group Charter
  "Routing Bridges (RBridges): Base Protocol Specification"
  "PPP Transparent Interconnection of Lots of Links (TRILL) Protocol Control Protocol " (TRILL over PPP)
  "Routing Bridges (RBridges): Appointed Forwarders"
  "Fibre Channel over Ethernet (FCoE) over Transparent Interconnection of Lots of Links (TRILL)"
  "Definitions of Managed Objects for Routing Bridges (RBridges)"
  "TRILL: Fine Grained Labeling"
  "TRILL: Transport Using Pseudowires"
  "TRILL: Support of BFD"
  "TRILL Use of IS-IS"
  "TRILL: Adjacency"
 "Introduction to Trill" by Radia Perlman and Donald Eastlake
 Original RBridge paper, “Rbridges: Transparent Routing”
 , "Transparent Interconnection of Lots of Links (TRILL): Problem and Applicability Statement"
 The Great Debate: TRILL Versus 802.1aq (SBP), NANOG 50 session (October 2010)
 Dissecting Cisco's FabricPath Ethernet technology

Link protocols